Karomia is a genus of plants in the family Lamiaceae. The genus was introduced in 1932 by the botanist Paul Louis Amans Dop (1876-1954) in 'Bulletin du Muséum national d'histoire naturelle' (Paris) ser. 2. 4: 1052, for the single species Karomia fragrans. It is native to eastern and southern Africa, Madagascar, and Vietnam.

Species
Karomia fragrans Dop – Vietnam
Karomia gigas (Faden) Verdc. – Kenya, Tanzania
Karomia humbertii (Moldenke) R.Fern. – Madagascar
Karomia macrocalyx (Baker) R.Fern. – Madagascar
Karomia madagascariensis (Moldenke) R.Fern. – Madagascar
Karomia microphylla (Moldenke) R.Fern. – Madagascar
Karomia mira (Moldenke) R.Fern. – Madagascar
Karomia speciosa (Hutch. & Corbishley) R.Fern. – Mozambique, Eswatini, South Africa
Karomia tettensis (Klotzsch) R.Fern. – Mozambique, Malawi, Zimbabwe, Zambia

References

Lamiaceae
Lamiaceae genera